DevLab (Development laboratory) is a research center headquartered in Eindhoven, The Netherlands. It is an alliance of thirteen Small and Medium Enterprises. In close co-operation with universities, with a network of professors and lectors, research projects are carried out by graduation students, Ph.D students, and employees of the member SMEs. With this concept DevLab is also partner in larger consortia, together with industry, universities and other research institutes.

History
The Development Club is one of the clusters of the Federation of Technology Branches in the Netherlands, FHI, within the branch industrial electronics. It is a network of approximately 45 technology companies working on product development in the field of electronics, mechatronics, embedded software and industrial design. The Development Club is the source of the idea to set up a co-operation where scientific research will be carried out, by and for the member companies. This eventually led to the foundation in 2004 of DevLab, Development Laboratories.

Research domains
The DevLab research agenda currently contains 4 focus areas:
 	sensor network technology (MyriaNed)
 	independent energy supply
 	embedded communication
 	advanced micro actuators

These areas are captured into a number of projects DevLab is leading or participating in.

Members

References

Organizations established in 2004
International research institutes
Information technology organisations based in the Netherlands
Eindhoven